Luana Bartholo de Assis (born 26 February 1985, in Rio de Janeiro) is a Brazilian rower.  With Fabiana Beltrame, she competed in the women's lightweight double sculls at the 2012 Summer Olympics.

References 

1985 births
Living people
Brazilian female rowers
Rowers from Rio de Janeiro (city)
Rowers at the 2012 Summer Olympics
Olympic rowers of Brazil